The SHA Grand Prix was a golf tournament on the PGA of Argentina Tour, formerly the principal professional golf tour in Argentina. The tournament has been played only seven times, the first in 1975, it has always been held at the SHA Golf Club, in Buenos Aires, Buenos Aires Province. It was last held in 2006.

Winners

External links
Profesionales de Golf de Argentina – official site

Golf tournaments in Argentina